Joe Staton ( born January 19, 1948) is an American comics artist and writer. He co-created the Bronze Age Huntress (Helena Wayne), as well as the third Huntress (Helena Bertinelli), Kilowog and the Omega Men for DC Comics. He was the artist of the Dick Tracy comic strip from 2011 to October 2021.

Early life
Joe Staton grew up in Tennessee and graduated from Murray State University in 1970.

Career

Staton started his comics career at Charlton Comics in 1971 and gained notability as the artist of the super-hero series E-Man. Staton produced art for various comics published by Charlton, Marvel Comics, and Warren Publishing during the 1970s.

Hired initially by Roy Thomas to work for Marvel, Staton was then recruited by Paul Levitz to work on DC Comics' revival of the Justice Society of America in All Star Comics and later Adventure Comics. In these titles he illustrated stories including the origin of the JSA in DC Special #29 and the death of the Earth-Two Batman. Staton also illustrated the solo adventures of two female JSA members created during the JSA revival – drawing Power Girl in Showcase and the Huntress. During that time, Staton additionally drew Superboy and the Legion of Super-Heroes, the 1970s revival of the Doom Patrol in Showcase, and the Metal Men. In 1979, Staton began a two-and-a-half-year run on Green Lantern, during which he co-created the Omega Men with writer Marv Wolfman.

Staton served as art director for First Comics for three years in the 1980s. He returned to DC Comics afterwards for a second run on Green Lantern and with writer Steve Englehart, oversaw the title's name change to Green Lantern Corps. Staton and Englehart also created the DC weekly crossover series Millennium (Jan.–Feb. 1988). Staton was one of the contributors to the DC Challenge limited series in 1986. In addition, he illustrated Guy Gardner, The Huntress, The New Guardians, and Superman & Bugs Bunny.

In the early 1990s, Staton provided the artwork on the Mike Danger Sunday comic strip, written by Max Allan Collins. From the late 90s to the late 2000s, Staton drew DC's Scooby-Doo title for younger readers, as well as the more mature-themed Femme Noir for Ape Entertainment. On January 19, 2011, Tribune Media Services announced that Staton and writer Mike Curtis would replace Dick Locher as the creative team of the Dick Tracy comic strip. The new creative team has worked together on Scooby-Doo, Richie Rich, and Casper the Friendly Ghost and started on March 14, 2011. He pencilled DC Retroactive: Green Lantern – The '80s #1, written by Len Wein, published the same year. Staton also illustrated Charles Santino's graphic novel adaptation of Ayn Rand's Anthem (2011).

Awards
Joe Staton received an Inkpot Award in 1983.

Staton and writer Mike Curtis received the Best Syndicated Strip Harvey Award for Dick Tracy in 2013, 2014, and 2015.

Bibliography

AC Comics
 Femforce #121 (Femme Noir) (2003)

Alpha Productions

 The Detectives #1 (Michael Mauser, Private Eye) (1993)

 E-Man #1 (1993)
 E-Man Returns #1 (1994)

Ape Entertainment
 Ape Entertainment's Cartoonapalooza #2 (Femme Noir) (2009)
Femme Noir: The Dark City Diaries #1–4 (2008)

Apple Press
 ElfQuest: Siege at Blue Mountain #1–5 (inker) (1987–1988)
 The New Crime Files of Michael Mauser, Private Eye #1 (1992)

Archie Comics
 Archie & Friends Double Digest Magazine #1–5 (2011)
 Archie's Super Teens #1 (1994)
 Jughead's Double Digest #139–142 (2008)

Bill Spicer 

 Fantasy Illustrated #2 (1964)

Caliber Press 

 Dominique: Protect and Serve #1 (1995)
 Negative Burn #18, 20, 33, 49 (1995–1997)

Century Comics For Action Hero 

 Actor Comics Presents #1 (2006)

CFD Productions 

 Noir #2 (Michael Mauser, Private Eye) (1995)

Charlton Comics
 Charlton Bullseye #4 (E-Man) (1976)
 E-Man #1–10 (1973–1975)
 Ghost Manor #5–6, 10, 13 (1972–1973)
 Ghostly Haunts #28, 32, 35–36 (1972–1973)
 Ghostly Tales #104, 117 (1973–1975)
 Haunted #11–12, 18, 21–22, 26 (1973–1976)
 Haunted Love #1–5 (1973)
 I Love You #91, 110 (1971–1975)
 Love and Romance #6 (1972)
 Love Diary #79, 88 (1972–1974)
 The Many Ghosts of Dr. Graves #30, 36–37, 41, 43, 47 (1972–1974)
 Midnight Tales #1–11, 13–14 (1972–1975)
 Monster Hunters #1 (1975)
 Primus #1–7 (1972)
 Scary Tales #1, 4 (1975–1976)
 Secret Romance #21 (1972)
 The Six Million Dollar Man #1–6 (1976–1978)
 Space 1999 #1–3, 5 (1975–1976)
 Sweethearts #133 (1973)
 Teen-Age Love #87 (1972)
 Teen Confessions #78 (1973)
 Vengeance Squad #1–6 (Michael Mauser, Private Eye) (1975–1976)
 Wheelie and the Chopper Bunch #1, 4–5 (1975–1976)

Charlton Neo
 Paul Kupperberg's Secret Romances #2 (2015)
 The Charlton Arrow vol. 2 #1–3 (E-Man) (2017–2018)

Comico
 E-Man #1–3 (1989–1990)
 Johnny Quest #2 (inker), #11 (penciller) (1986–1987)
 Maze Agency #6 (1989)

CPL/GANG Publications 

 The Charlton Bullseye #4 (E-Man) (1976)

CrossGen
 Crossovers #7–9 (2003)

Dark Horse 

 Michael Chabon Presents: The Amazing Adventures of the Escapist #2 (2004)

DC Comics
 9-11: The World's Finest Comic Book Writers & Artists Tell Stories to Remember, Vol. 2 (2002)
 Action Comics #525–526, 531, 535–536 (1981–1982)
 Adventure Comics #445–447 (inker); #456–478 (penciller) (1976–1980)
 All-Star Comics #66–74 (1977–1978)
 Batman #334 (1981)
 Batman 80-Page Giant #3 (2000)
 Batman & Superman Adventures: World's Finest #1 (1997)
 Batman and Robin Adventures #17, 21, Annual #2 (1997)
 Batman and Robin Adventures: Sub-Zero #1 (1998)
 Batman Beyond #4–6 (1999)
 Batman Chronicles #15 (1999)
 Batman Family #18–20 (Huntress) (1978)
 Batman: Blackgate #1 (1997)
 Batman: Death of Innocents #1 (1996)
 Batman: Gotham Adventures #29 (2000)
 Batman: Legends of the Dark Knight #65–68, Annual #4 (1994–1995)
 Batman: Penguin Triumphant #1 (1992)
 Batman: Shadow of the Bat #14–15, 42, Annual #2 (1993–1995)
 Batman: Two-Face Strikes Twice #1–2 (1993)
 Blackhawk #271 (1984)
 Brave & the Bold #148, 197 (1979, 1983)
 DC Challenge #7 (1986)
 DC Comics Presents #9–11, 15–16, 21, 23, 39, 96 (1979–1981, 1986)
 DC Retroactive: Green Lantern – The '80s #1 (2011)
 DC Special #29 (1977)
 DC Special Series #10 (Doctor Fate) (1978)
 DC Super Friends #2 (2008)
 DC Super Stars #17 (Huntress) (1977)
 DCU Holiday Bash #3 (1998)
 Doctor Fate #21 (1990)
 Family Man #1–3 (1995)
 Green Lantern vol. 2 #123–155, 188–205 (1979–1982, 1985–1986)
 Green Lantern vol. 3 #9–13, 18–19, 25 (1991–1992)
 Green Lantern Corps #206–217, 221–222 (1986–1988)
 Green Lantern Corps Quarterly #1 (1992)
 Green Lantern Secret Files #2 (1999)
 Gross Point #2, 4–7, 9–12 (1997–1998)
 Guy Gardner #1–14, 44, Annual #2 (1992–1993, 1996)
 Guy Gardner Reborn #1–3 (1992)
 Heroes Against Hunger #1 (inker) (1986)
 House of Mystery #300 (1982)
 Huntress #1–19 (1989–1990)
 Karate Kid #1–9 (inker) (1976–1977)
 Justice League Adventures #7 (2002)
 Justice League of America #244 (1985)
 Justice League International Special #2 (1991)
 Legion of Superheroes #259–260 (1980)
 The Life Story of the Flash HC (with Gil Kane) (1998)
 Looney Tunes #140 (2006)
 Metal Men #50–56 (1977–1978)
 Millennium #1–8 (1988)
 Mystery in Space #113 (1980)
 New Guardians #1–9 (1988–1989)
 Outsiders #4 (Metamorpho story) (1986)
 Power Company: Skyrocket #1 (2002)
 Power of Shazam #19 (1996)
 Secret Origins #36, 50 (1989–1990)
 Scooby-Doo #3, 5, 10–14, 16–23, 26–39, 41–48, 50, 52–67, 69, 71, 73–75, 77–78, 80–89, 91, 93, 95–100, 102–107, 109, 111–112, 119, 125–126, 143, 158 (#16 also writer) (1997–2010)
 Showcase #94–96 (Doom Patrol); #97–99 (Power Girl); #100 (1977–1978)
 Showcase '95 #10 (1995)
 Superboy and the Legion of Superheroes #227, 243–249, 252–258 (1976, 1978–1979)
 Superman & Bugs Bunny #1–4 (2000)
 Superman Adventures #41, Annual #1 (1997, 2000)
 Superman Adventures: Dimension of the Dark Shadows #1 (promo) (1998)
 Superman Family #191–194 (Superboy) (1978–1979)
 Super Friends #43, 45 (Plastic Man) (1981)
 Tales of the Green Lantern Corps #1–3 (1981)
 Who's Who: The Definitive Directory of the DC Universe #3–4, 7 (1985)
 Wonder Woman #241; #271–287, 289–290, 294–299 (Huntress feature) (1978, 1980–1983)
 World's Finest Comics #262, 273 (1980–1981)

Digital Webbing
 E-Man Recharged #1 (2006)
 E-Man: Course of the Idol oneshot (2009)
 E-Man: Dolly #1 (2007)
 Digital Webbing Jam 2007 oneshot (E-Man) (2007)

Disney
 Disney Adventures #4 (1997)

EC 

 Mad #340 (1995)

Eclipse Comics
 Destroyer Duck #1 (1982)

First Comics
 American Flagg! #28–32, 39–40 (1986–1987)
 Badger Goes Berserk #3 (1989)
 Crossroads #3 (1988)
 E-Man #1–25 (#9, 11–23 also writer) (1983–1985)
 Gift #1 (1990)
 Grimjack #5, 33 (1984, 1987)
 Meta-4 #3 (inker) (1991)
 P.I.'s: Michael Mauser and Ms. Tree #1–3 (1984–1985)
 Warp #1 (inker) (1983)

Hamilton Comics 

 Captain Cosmos, The Last Starveyer #0 (1997)
 Grave Tales #1–3 (1991–1992)
 Maggots #1, 3 (1991–1992)

Innovation Comics
 Maze Agency Special #1 (1990)

IPC 

 2000 AD and Tornado #133 (1979)

Kitchen Sink Press 

 The Spirit #30 (penciller, two pages) (1981)

Malibu Comics
 Dinosaurs for Hire #8 (1993)
 Prime #21 (1995)

Marvel Comics
 Amazing Spider-Man #150 (layouts, with Gil Kane) (1975)
 Avengers #127–134 (inker) (1974–1975)
 Avengers: Celestial Quest #7 (2002)
 Deadly Hands of Kung Fu #28, 31–32 (1976–1977)
 Fallen Angels #5–6, 8 (1987)
 Fred Hembeck Destroys the Marvel Universe #1 (inker, with Vince Colletta) (1989)
 Incredible Hulk #187–189, 191–209 (inker) (1974–1977)
 Justice #4 (1987)
 Marvel Comics Presents #74 (1991)
 Marvel Fanfare #39, 50 (1988, 1990)
 Silver Surfer vol. 3 #11, 13–14, Annual #1 (1988)
 Toxic Crusaders #2, 4 (1992)
 Vampire Tales #8 (1974)
 What The--?! #21–22 (1992)

Ni-Cola Productions 

 Captain Cosmos, The Last Starveyer #2, 4 (2001–2006)

Penguin (New American Library) 

 Anthem GN (2011)

Star*Reach 

 Star*Reach #5–7 (1976–1977)

Topps Comics
 Exosquad #0 (1994)
 Return to Jurassic Park #1–4 (1995)

Warren Publishing
 Creepy #42, 136 (1971, 1982)

Wonderful Publishing Company 

 Witzend #10 (1976)

Ybor City Publishers 

 Captain Cosmos, The Last Starveyer #1 (1998)

References

Further reading
 Bethke, Marlyn and Alexandre Koehn, "From E-Man to Batman: Joe Staton Interview," The Comics Journal #45 (March 1979), pp. 37–45.

External links

 
 
 "DC Profiles #51: Joe Staton" at the Grand Comics Database
 Joe Staton at Mike's Amazing World of Comics
 Joe Staton at the Unofficial Handbook of Marvel Comics Creators
 Biography on Steve Englehart.com

1948 births
20th-century American artists
21st-century American artists
American art directors
American comics artists
Artists from North Carolina
Comics inkers
DC Comics people
Dick Tracy
Inkpot Award winners
Living people
Marvel Comics people
Murray State University alumni